The Songhees First Nation is a First Nations government that represents the Songhees, or Lekwungen people. They are located around Victoria, British Columbia on southern Vancouver Island, British Columbia, Canada.

See also
 Coast Salish peoples
 Naut'sa Mawt Tribal Council
 North Straits Salish language
 Songhees

External links
Songhees & Esquimalt Nations website

Southern Vancouver Island
Coast Salish governments